The 2000–01 Segunda División season saw 22 teams participate in the second flight Spanish league. The teams that promoted to La Liga (top division) were Sevilla FC, Real Betis and CD Tenerife. The teams that relegated to Segunda División B were SD Compostela, Universidad de Las Palmas CF, Getafe CF and UE Lleida.

Teams

Teams by Autonomous Community

Final table

Results

Segunda División seasons
2000–01 in Spanish football leagues
Spain